Mahmoud Sabri (born 14 July 1927 - died 13 April 2012) was an Iraqi painter who was considered to be one of the pioneers of Iraqi modern art  and one of the pillars of modernism in Iraqi art.

Life and career

Sabri was born on 14 July 1927 in Baghdad, Iraq.  He studied social sciences at Loughborough University in the late 1940s. While in England, his interest in painting developed and he attended evening art classes there. After a successful career in banking, he became a full-time painter.

In the 1950s he pioneered the painting of social and political issues. Later he studied art formally at the Surikov Institute for Art in Moscow from 1961 to 1963. In 1963, he moved to Prague.  In the late 1960s he started working on linking art and science.

He was actively involved in Iraq's arts community through his membership of various art groups. He was a foundation member of Jum'at al Ruwwad (The Avantgarde Group; later known as the Primitive Group) in 1950. Led by his contemporary, Faeq Hassan (1914-1992), this group was inspired by Mespotamian art, Iraqi folklore  and the 12th and 13th-century poets of the Baghdad School.

In 1971, he published his Manifesto of the New Art of Quantum Realism (QR)-An application of scientific method in the field of art. QR graphically represents the atomic level of reality using building blocks based on the atomic light spectra of elements in nature.  He continued to work on developing QR until his death. He had several publications on art, philosophy and politics in Arabic and English.

He died on 13 April 2012 in Maidenhead, England.

See also
 Iraqi art
 List of Iraqi artists

References

Further reading 

 Examples of M.Sabri's painintings on different websites: Department of Art at the Ministry of Culture in Iraq,"Algeria" painted in 1956,"Iraqi artists" website, Quantum Realism website.
 Mahmoud Sabri's retrospective exhibition in London 2013 on Global/Local Art website.
 A selection of articles by different Iraqi artists and art critics about Mahmoud Sabri and his work published after his death in April 2012.
 "The Institution of Aesthetic Discourse, rooting references in modern Iraqi art]" Al Kasab, Saad, in Arabic, Beirut-2012, . The book contains three essays about 3 leading Iraqi artists Jewad Selim, Mahmoud Sabri, and Shakir Hassan Al Said.
  "Between 2 Worlds", a film about Mahmoud Sabri's work, directed by Bahjat Sabri, 2008.
 Intersections of Art, Technology, Science & Culture - Links. Comprehensive list of links between art and research compiled by Prof Stephen Wilson, Art Dept, San Francisco State University. (Refer to the Atomic Level Physics section). http://userwww.sfsu.edu/infoarts/links/wilson.artlinks2.physics.html .
 Sabri, Mahmoud(1971). Manifesto of the New Art of Quantum Realism (in English).
 Sabri, Mahmoud(1975). Quantum Realism - an art of the techno-nuclear age (in English), Baghdad-Iraq:Ramzi Publishing.

1927 births
2012 deaths
Iraqi painters
Iraqi expatriates in the United Kingdom
Iraqi expatriates in the Soviet Union
Iraqi expatriates in Czechoslovakia